The cuneiform giš sign, (also common for is, iṣ, and iz), is a common, multi-use sign, in the Epic of Gilgamesh, the Amarna letters, and other cuneiform texts. It also has a major usage as a sumerogram, GIŠ, (capital letter (majuscule)) for English language "wood", and is used as a determinative at the beginning of words, for items made of wood. The 12 Chapters (Tablets) of the Epic of Gilgamesh lists 16 named items beginning with "GIŠ".

For giš/(is/iz/iṣ) in the construction of words it is used syllabically for giš, and syllabically for the three other constructs; also for eṣ/ez. Besides "giš", it can alphabetically be used for: e, i, s, ṣ, or z.

Epic of Gilgamesh sign usage
The usage numbers for giš in the Epic of Gilgamesh are as follows: eṣ-(2) times, ez, (3), giš, (1), is, (46), iṣ, (77), iz, (17), and GIŠ (355) times.

Epic words with determinative GIŠ
The following list of Akkadian language words are from the sumerograms used in the Epic of Gilgamesh.

--GIŠ.APIN, epinnu ("plow")
--GIŠ.BAN, qaštu (?)
--GIŠ.BANŠUR, paššūru ("table")
--GIŠ.ERIN, erēnu ("cedar")
--GIŠ.GAG, sikkatu ("flask (of perfume)")
--GIŠ.GIGIR, mugirru (?)
--GIŠ.GU.ZA, kussû ("throne", "seat")
--GIŠ.IG, daltu ("door")

--GIŠ.MÁ, eleppu ("boat, ship")
--GIŠ.NIM, baltu ("thornbush")
--GIŠ.SAR, kirû ("garden", "orchard")
--GIŠ.ŠEM.GIR, asu ("myrtle")
--GIŠ.ŠUR.MÌN, šurmenu ("cypress")
--GIŠ.TIR, qištu ("forest")
--GIŠ.TUKUL, kakku ("weapon")
--GIŠ.Ú.GIR, ašagu ("thistle", "thorn bush")

References

Moran, William L. 1987, 1992. The Amarna Letters. Johns Hopkins University Press, 1987, 1992. 393 pages.(softcover)
 Parpola, 1971. The Standard Babylonian Epic of Gilgamesh, Parpola, Simo, Neo-Assyrian Text Corpus Project, c 1997, Tablet I thru Tablet XII, Index of Names, Sign List, and Glossary-(pp. 119–145), 165 pages.

Cuneiform signs